Apiwat Chaemcharoen (Thai อภิวัฒน์ แจ่มเจริญ), is a Thai futsal midfielder, and currently a member of  Thailand national futsal team.

International goals
Scores and results list Thailand's goal tally first.

References

Apiwat Chaemcharoen
1991 births
Living people
Futsal forwards
Apiwat Chaemcharoen
Apiwat Chaemcharoen
Southeast Asian Games medalists in futsal
Competitors at the 2011 Southeast Asian Games